Dimethyl sulfite is a sulfite ester with the chemical formula (CH3O)2SO.

Dimethyl sulfite is used as an additive in some polymers to prevent oxidation.  It is also a potentially useful high energy battery electrolyte solvent.

Structure and conformation
The dimethyl sulfite molecule can adopt several conformations. The most stable is the GG conformer. Each C–O bond is gauche to the S=O bond, depicted below.

Preparation
Dimethyl sulfite is prepared from a 1:2 ratio of thionyl chloride and methanol. The reaction can be catalyzed by tertiary amine bases and likely proceeds via the chlorosulfinate (MeOS(O)Cl), this intermediate will exist only fleetingly in the presence of methanol and as such its decomposition to methyl chloride and sulfur dioxide (via the slower SNi mechanism) is not observed to any great extent.

See also
 Methyl methanesulfonate, a chemical with the same molecular formula but different arrangement of atoms
 Diethyl sulfite, a similar sulfite ester
 Dimethyl sulfoxide
 Dimethyl sulfate, a sulfate ester

References

External links
 WebBook page for C2H6SO3

Organosulfites
Methyl esters